South Melbourne College was a co-education boarding school in South Melbourne, Victoria, Australia.  The school was founded by Thomas Palmer in 1883.

John Bernard O'Hara became a partner in 1889 and became sole proprietor in 1893-4.  In his hands it became a leading private school in Victoria. During a period of eight years, of 28 first-class honours gained by all the schools of Victoria in physics and chemistry, 14 were obtained by pupils from South Melbourne College. O'Hara was an inspiring teacher, and many of his pupils went on to hold distinguished positions in the universities of Australia.

From 1905, the school was located at 76 Kerferd Rd, South Melbourne.

O'Hara closed the school in 1917 due to ill health.

The Fred Walker Company acquired the premises in 1920, housing the food manufacturing business which later produced Vegemite.

Notable alumni
Edith Helen Barrett, medical doctor
 Don Cameron, politician
Isabella Jobson, nurse who served in World War I
 Paul Jones, politician
 Katharine Susannah Prichard, author
 Henry Caselli Richards, geologist
 T. J. Ryan, politician
 Walter Nairn, politician
  Doctor Sister Mary Glowrey JMJ, medical missionary in India
  Doctor Elsie Carne (nee Thomas), medical missionary in India and Fiji

References

Educational institutions established in 1889
Private secondary schools in Melbourne
Defunct schools in Victoria (Australia)
1889 establishments in Australia